Lalit Narayan Mishra (2 February 1923 – 3 January 1975) was an Indian politician who served as Minister of Railways in the government of India from 1973 to 1975. He was brought into politics by the first Chief Minister of Bihar, Sri Krishna Sinha, when he was made parliamentary secretary at his insistence to the First Prime Minister of India, Jawaharlal Nehru. In 1975, he died in a bomb blast at Samastipur railway station. The court case was delayed for years and was finally completed in December 2014.

Early life 
Lalit Narayan Mishra was born on Basant Panchmi in 1922 at Basanpatti in Supaul District of Bihar in a Maithil Brahmin family. He gained a Master of Arts degree in economics from Patna University in 1948. He held nationalists Sri Krishna Sinha and Anugrah Narayan Sinha in high esteem.

Political career 
Mishra joined the Indian National Congress party and was a member of the first, second Lok Sabha and 5th Lok Sabha. He was a member of the Rajya Sabha in 1964 to 1966 then in 1966 to 1972. He was Parliamentary Secretary, Ministry of Planning, Labour and Employment (1957–60), Deputy Minister for Home Affairs (1964–66), Deputy Finance Minister (1966–67), Minister of State for Defence Production (1967–70). From 1970 till 4 February 1973 he was Minister of Foreign Trade. On 5 February 1973 he was made Cabinet Minister of Railways by then Prime Minister Indira Gandhi.

As a Minister of Foreign Trade, he was one of the first to recognize the potential of future Prime Minister of India, Dr Manmohan Singh and appointed him as his adviser at the Ministry of Foreign Trade. Their first meeting happened coincidentally on an India-US-Chile flight. Mr. Mishra the minister for commerce (then called minister for foreign trade) was on his way to Santiago, Chile, to attend a meeting of UNCTAD.

Assassination 
As Minister of Railways, he visited Samastipur on 2 January 1975 to declare the Samastipur-Darbhanga broad gauge railway line open. A bomb explosion on the dais seriously injured him. He was rushed to the railway hospital at Danapur, where he died the next day.

Investigation and trial 
Indira Gandhi blamed "foreign elements" for the murder, probably referring to the CIA. His brother Jagannath Mishra denied the claim that LN Mishra and Indira Gandhi had received bribes from the KGB as alleged in the Mitrokhin Archives; the Congress Party describes the book as "pure sensationalism and vague".
On 26 July 2012, the Supreme Court stated that it will go into the causes of delay as even after 33 years, the trial was yet to conclude in the session court. As of July 2013, the 27-year-old man accused of the murder was 65 years old. Of the 39 witnesses he cited to prove his innocence, 31 have died. More than 20 different judges have heard his case over the years, supposedly on a day-by-day basis.

After 39 years of trial, on 8 December 2014 four men accused of Mishra's murder were found guilty by a Delhi court. A fifth accused in the case had died. Three Ananda Marga followers, Santoshanand, Sudevanand and Gopalji, along with advocate Ranjan Dwivedi, were held guilty of murdering Mishra and two others. They were sentenced to life imprisonment by district judge and were fined amounts ranging from Rs 25,000 and Rs 20,000. The court noted that Prabhat Ranjan Sarkar, the religious leader of Ananda Marga, was jailed following his accusations in a murder case so his followers murdered Mishra to build pressure on Indira Gandhi government to release Sarkar. Sarkar was later acquitted. The court also noted that the six Ananda Marga followers met at a village in Bhagalpur district, Bihar and planned the conspiracy in 1973. In a recent trial, the High Court quashed the verdict of the lower trial court and all the four accused have been acquitted as the evidence provided by C.B.I. could not convince the High Court bench.

Legacy
A university, Lalit Narayan Mithila University, MBA institutes, Lalit Narayan Mishra Institute of Economic Development and Social Change, Patna (LNMI, Patna), L N Mishra Institute of Business Management, Muzaffarpur and a railway hospital in Gorakhpur, UP are named after him. The Government of India issued a postage stamp in his memory.

See also
 List of assassinated Indian politicians

References

External links
 
 University
 Institute=
 College of Business
 http://www.indianrailways.gov.in/deptts/mpp/Instructions%20for%20medical.pdf
 https://web.archive.org/web/20170120134529/http://ebiharjharkhand.in/mnega-first-time-in-delhi-fine-day/
 

1923 births
1975 deaths
1975 in India
1975 murders in India
India MPs 1952–1957
India MPs 1957–1962
India MPs 1971–1977
Assassinated Indian politicians
Commerce and Industry Ministers of India
Crime in Bihar
Deaths by explosive device
Indian National Congress politicians
Lok Sabha members from Bihar
People from Bihar
People from Saharsa district
People murdered in Bihar
People murdered in India
Railway Ministers of India
Rajya Sabha members from Bihar